Chitinimonas naiadis is a Gram-negative, aerobic, rod-shaped and motile bacterium from the genus of Chitinimonas which has been isolated from water from the Yeongsan River in Korea.

References

Burkholderiaceae
Bacteria described in 2017